A Friend of the Family is an American drama miniseries. Based on true events, it follows Robert Berchtold, a close friend of the Broberg family, who kidnaps Jan Broberg twice over a period of two years. It consists of nine episodes and premiered on Peacock on October 6, 2022. The events depicted in the series were previously covered in the 2017 documentary Abducted in Plain Sight.

Plot
In 1974, Robert Berchtold, a close friend of the Broberg family-turned-serial child abductor, kidnaps Jan Broberg, age twelve. After she was returned to her parents, he abducts her again at age fourteen in 1976.

Cast and characters

Main 
 Jake Lacy as Robert Berchtold
 Colin Hanks as Bob Broberg
 Lio Tipton as Gail Berchtold
 Mckenna Grace as Jan Broberg
 Hendrix Yancey portrays young Jan Broberg
 Anna Paquin as Mary Ann Broberg

Recurring 
 Austin Stowell as FBI Agent Peter Walsh
 Patrick Fischler as Garth Pincock
 Philip Ettinger as Joe Berchtold
 Maggie Sonnier as Karen Broberg
 Mila Harris portrays young Karen Broberg
 Norah Murphy as Susan Broberg
 Elle Lisic portrays young Susan Broberg
 Tyler Wojton as Joel Berchtold
 Bree Elrod as Jennifer Ferguson
 Ella Jay Basco as Sofia
 Callie Johnson as Cop #4
 Kate Adams as Eileen
 Keilah Davies as Young Caroline Hansen
 Jan Broberg as Jan's psychologist

Episodes

Production

Development
In May 2020, it was announced Universal Content Productions was developing a series revolving around Jan Broberg's kidnappings, with Nick Antosca set to write and executive produce the series under his Eat the Cat banner, with Broberg and Mary Ann Broberg set to serve as producers. In February 2022, Peacock gave the series a straight-to-series order, with Eliza Hittman set to direct episodes and executive produce.

Casting
In February 2022, Jake Lacy, Anna Paquin, Colin Hanks, and Lio Tipton joined the cast, followed by Hendrix Yancey and Mckenna Grace the following month. Austin Stowell, Patrick Fischler, Bree Elrod, and Philip Ettinger joined the month after that. Finally, Ella Jay Basco joined the cast that July.

Filming
Principal photography commenced by February 2022.

Reception
The review aggregator website Rotten Tomatoes reported a 91% approval rating with an average rating of 7.8/10, based on 23 critic reviews. The website's critics consensus reads, "Unspooling like a slow-motion nightmare, A Friend of the Family benefits immeasurably from Eliza Hittman's deft direction and Jake Lacy's unflinching portrayal of insidious evil."  Metacritic, which uses a weighted average, assigned a score of 73 out of 100 based on 12 critics, indicating "generally favorable reviews".

References

External links
 

2020s American drama television series
2022 American television series debuts
2022 American television series endings
Peacock (streaming service) original programming
English-language television shows
Television series by Universal Content Productions